The 1961 Canadian Grand Prix was a motor race held at Mosport Park on September 30, 1961, held for sports cars eligible for the Canadian Sports Car Championship regulations. 26 cars started the race. It was the first time a motor race had carried the name Canadian Grand Prix, which in future years would become an event on the Formula One world championship. The race was won by Canadian driver Peter Ryan driving a Lotus 19. Ryan finished a lap ahead of Mexican racer Pedro Rodríguez driving a North American Racing Team-run Ferrari 250 TR with pole sitter Stirling Moss third in another Lotus 19 run by his Formula One team, UDT Laystall Racing.

Results
Class winners in bold.

References

Canadian Grand Prix
Canadian Grand Prix
Canadian Grand
September 1961 sports events in Canada